Battle of Miserere was a battle that occurred during the second British invasion of the Río de la Plata between the British troops at the command of John Whitelocke, and the Spanish forces commanded by Santiago de Liniers. The confrontation took place on 2 July 1807 in the current Miserere square, Balvanera neighborhood, city of Buenos Aires.

References 

Conflicts in 1807
History of South America
Battles of the Napoleonic Wars
Battles involving Great Britain
Battles involving Spain